Sejdefu majka buđaše (English: Seydefa's Mother Wakes Her) is a Bosnian ( Bosnia and Hercegovina )  traditional folk and sevdalinka song.

Origins
Sejdefu majka buđaše is a traditional song that is believed to have originated in Sarajevo centuries ago, while the region of Bosnia was a part of the Ottoman Empire. The exact author is unknown.

Over the centuries, the song spread amongst the Bosniak populations in Podgorica and the Sandžak regions of Montenegro and Serbia.

Lyrics

Covers

| width="50%" align="left" valign="top" style="border:0"|
Sinan Alimanović
Amira Medunjanin
Ana Bekuta
Hanka Paldum
Ksenija Cicvarić
Lepa Brena
Merima Njegomir
| width="50%" align="left" valign="top" style="border:0"|
Neda Ukraden
Silvana Armenulić
Snežana Đurišić
Suzan Kardeş
Zehra Deović

In popular culture
It was sung by Kosovo-born singer Suzan Kardeş on the Turkish soap opera Muhteşem Yüzyıl (called Sulejman Veličanstveni in the former Yugoslav countries and Magnificent Century in English) in the 44th episode of the series that aired in January 2012.

See also
List of Bosnia and Herzegovina folk songs
Sevdalinka
Emina
Moj dilbere

References

Sevdalinka
Bosnia and Herzegovina songs
Bosnia and Herzegovina music
Bosniak culture
Bosnia and Herzegovina folk music